Untergruppenführer (junior group leader) was a rare and short lived rank of the Sturmabteilung which existed in the SA for a few months in late 1929 and 1930.  The rank was created as an intermediary position between the ranks of SA-Oberführer and SA-Gruppenführer.  The rank was held by those Oberführer who were selected to command the early SA-brigades first formed in 1929.  There was no prescribed insignia for those holding the rank, with the Untergruppenführer continuing to wear the uniform of an SA-Oberführer.

The rank of Untergruppenführer was replaced by SA-Brigadeführer in 1931 but continued as an "ad hoc" title in the SA until 1933.

References
 Senior Rank Insignia of the SA and SS (Poster Chart), NSDAP (1931)

Nazi paramilitary ranks